White Post Road (also known as Banbury Cricket Club Ground) is a cricket ground in Bodicote, Oxfordshire.

History
Banbury Cricket Club originally played in Banbury at Grange Road, but the Banbury Recreational Trust sold the ground to a housing developer. The Trust moved the cricket club to a new ground close by at White Post Road in the neighbouring village of Bodicote, with the new ground being ready for the 1996 season. Oxfordshire first played minor counties cricket there against Dorset in the 1997 Minor Counties Championship. Oxfordshire later played two List A one-day matches there against Herefordshire in the 1st round of the 2003 Cheltenham & Gloucester Trophy (played in 2002) and the Lancashire Cricket Board in the 1st round of the 2004 Cheltenham & Gloucester Trophy (played in 2003).

Records

List A
Highest team total: 267 for 9 (50 overs) by Herefordshire v Oxfordshire, 2003
Lowest team total: 141 all out (31.4 overs) by Oxfordshire v Herefordshire, as above
Highest individual innings: 67 not out by Stephen Dearden for Lancashire Cricket Board v Oxfordshire, 2002
Best bowling in an innings: 5-19 by Franklyn Rose for Herefordshire v Oxfordshire, 2003

See also
List of Oxfordshire County Cricket Club grounds

Notes and references

External links
White Post Road at ESPNcricinfo

Banbury
Sports venues completed in 1997
Cricket grounds in Oxfordshire
Oxfordshire County Cricket Club